Lophiodon (from  , 'crest' and   'tooth') is an extinct genus of mammal related to chalicotheres.

References

Eocene odd-toed ungulates
Fossil taxa described in 1822
Taxa named by Georges Cuvier
Extinct mammals of Europe